Canada competed at the 2014 Summer Youth Olympics, in Nanjing, China from 16 August to 28 August 2014. Field hockey Olympian Sandra Levy was chosen to be the nation's chef de mission. The Canadian team consists of 75 athletes in 19 sports.

Medalists
Medals awarded to participants of mixed-NOC (Combined) teams are represented in italics. These medals are not counted towards the individual NOC medal tally.

Archery

Canada qualified a male archer from its performance at the American Continental Qualification Tournament.

Individual

Team

Athletics

Canada qualified 10 athletes.

Qualification Legend: Q=Final A (medal); qB=Final B (non-medal); qC=Final C (non-medal); qD=Final D (non-medal); qE=Final E (non-medal)

Boys
Track & road events

Field Events

Girls
Track & road events

Field events

Mixed events

Beach Volleyball

Canada qualified a boys' team by winning the NORCECA Central Zone Qualifier and qualified a girls' team by their performance at the NORCECA Final YOG Qualifier.

Canoeing

Canada qualified two boats based on its performance at the 2013 World Junior Canoe Sprint and Slalom Championships.

Boys

Girls

Diving

Canada qualified four quotas based on its performance at the Nanjing 2014 Diving Qualifying Event.

Fencing

Canada qualified two athletes based on its performance at the 2014 FIE Cadet World Championships.

Boys

Girls

Mixed Team

Field Hockey

Canada qualified a boys' team based on its performance at the 2014 Youth American Championship.

Boys' Tournament

Roster

 Parmeet Gill
 Liam Manning
 Floyd Mascarenhas
 Braedon Muldoon
 Balraj Panesar
 Brandon Pereira
 Vikramjeet Sandhu
 Amrit Sidhu
 Harbir Sidhu

Group Stage

Quarterfinal

Semifinal

Gold medal match

Golf

Canada qualified one team of two athletes based on the 8 June 2014 IGF Combined World Amateur Golf Rankings.

Individual

Team

Gymnastics

Artistic Gymnastics

Canada qualified two athletes based on its performance at the 2014 Junior Pan American Artistic Gymnastics Championships.

Boys

Girls

Rhythmic Gymnastics
Canada qualified one team based on its performance at the 2014 Junior Pan American Rhythmic Championships.

Team

Judo

Canada qualified two athletes based on its performance at the 2013 Cadet World Judo Championships.

Individual

Team

Modern Pentathlon

Canada qualified one athlete based on the 1 June 2014 Olympic Youth A Pentathlon World Rankings.

Rowing

Canada qualified one boat based on its performance at the 2013 World Rowing Junior Championships. Canada later received a reallocation spot in the boy's single sculls event.

Qualification Legend: FA=Final A (medal); FB=Final B (non-medal); FC=Final C (non-medal); FD=Final D (non-medal); SA/B=Semifinals A/B; SC/D=Semifinals C/D; R=Repechage

Rugby Sevens

Canada qualified a girls' team based on its performance at the 2013 Rugby World Cup Sevens.

Girls' Tournament

Roster

 Moanda Anglo
 Catherine Boudreault
 Pamphinette Buisa
 Hannah Darling
 Chanelle Edwards-Challenger
 Ashley Gordon
 Lauren Kerr
 Jenna Morrison
 Kaitlyn Richard
 Cass Schmidt
 Maddy Seatle
 Charity Williams

Group Stage

Semifinal

Gold Medal Match

Sailing

Canada qualified one boat based on its performance at the 2013 World Byte CII Championships.

Shooting

Canada qualified two shooters based on its performance at the Americas Qualification Event held during a Shooting World Cup event in Fort Benning.

Canada's all quotas were obtained in 10m Air Pistol events. Peter Karl Otto Schulze ended 2nd in Men's Air Pistol and won a quota. Andrey-Ann Le Sieur finished 5th at Women's Air Pistol and got a quota, even though her compatriot Dayna Marie Boser ended 4th in the same event, and that was because Le Sieur's MQS was slightly above the qualification score.

Individual

Team

Swimming

Canada qualified seven swimmers.

Boys

Girls

Mixed

Table Tennis

Canada qualified one athlete based on its performance at the North American Qualification Event.

Singles

Team

Qualification Legend: Q=Main Bracket (medal); qB=Consolation Bracket (non-medal)

Taekwondo

Canada qualified one athlete based on its performance at the Taekwondo Qualification Tournament.

Boys

Triathlon

Canada qualified two athletes based on its performance at the 2014 American Youth Olympic Games Qualifier.

Individual

Relay

Wrestling

Canada qualified four athletes based on its performance at the 2014 Pan American Cadet Championships.

Boys

Girls

See also
Canada at the 2014 Commonwealth Games
Canada at the 2014 Winter Olympics

References

2014 in Canadian sports
Nations at the 2014 Summer Youth Olympics
Canada at the Youth Olympics